Umbra is the second studio album from Japanese electronica/rock duo Boom Boom Satellites, released on February 7, 2001.

Track listing

Personnel
Credits adapted from liner notes.
 Art Direction, Design – Shin-Ichiro Hirata*
 Artwork [Artwork Co-ordinator] – Yuki Sugawara
 Directed By – Tatsunori Toyama
 Drums [Additional Drummer] – Naoki Hirai
 Engineer [Additional] – Kenji Furukawa, Kikou Uehara, Mike Nealsen*
 Executive-Producer – Hirofumi Satoh, Lucy Tonegi
 Lyrics By – Chuck D (tracks: 4)
 Mastered By – Quincy Tanaka*
 Photography By – Yoshiyuki Hata
 Programmed By, Bass – Masayuki Nakano
 Saxophone, Flute – Nao Takeuchi (tracks: 3 to 5)
 Strings, Arranged By – Asuka Strings (tracks: 2)
 Trumpet – Issei Igarashi (tracks: 3)
 Vocals, Guitar – Michiyuki Kawashima
 Written-By, Arranged By, Producer, Mixed By – Boom Boom Satellites

References

External links
 Boom Boom Satellites official website
 'On' review by Keikaku.net

2001 albums
Boom Boom Satellites albums